Mi Pueblo was a Northern California neighborhood grocery chain based in San Jose, California. Mi Pueblo had a total of 22 store locations throughout the San Francisco Bay Area, Central Valley and Monterey Bay Peninsula. It attempted to emulate the fresh-food markets of Mexico and
Latin America while also carrying all the grocery items generally available in mainstream supermarkets.

Mi Pueblo was established in 1991. In 2016, Kohlberg Kravis Roberts purchased Mi Pueblo along with Ontario, California–based Cardenas. The two chains merged in July 2017, and the Mi Pueblo brand was phased out the following year.

History and founder
Juvenal Chavez is the founder and chairman of the board of Mi Pueblo. Chavez emigrated from Mexico in 1984 and spoke no English at the time, taking odd jobs while attending night school to learn English. At one point he worked as a janitor at Stanford University. And in 1986, he went into business with his brother running Chavez Meat Market. In 1991, deciding to go off on his own, he purchased Country Time Meats in San Jose, California, starting his mercantile chain. Chavez opened his first business in the Bay Area because he found that the Hispanic population was very under-served and needed to purchase food easily without being impeded by their lack of knowledge in the English language. He started with the meat business because it was the most obvious opportunity. Over time he expanded into produce, bakery and deli, then grocery. Now Mi Pueblo is a $300 million business, with 19 stores opened and significant growth on the horizon.

Leadership
In June 2014, Mi Pueblo announced its emergence from Chapter 11 bankruptcy after receiving $56 million in financing from Chicago- based investment firm Victory Park Capital (VPC). With this announcement came the appointment of Javier Ramirez as president and chief executive officer of Mi Pueblo.

Ramirez was also joined by Martin Cortes as chief financial officer and Jose Aguayo as vice president of human resources to help stabilize the company from a financial and staffing standpoint.

Departments, products and services
Mi Pueblo has seven different departments in the store. The first department is the meat department, offering a wide variety of Latin American-styled marinated meats, entrails, poultry, and seafood - along with a full-service butcher staff. The next department is the produce department. The third department is the bakery, featuring items such as bolillos, tres leches cake and pan dulce. The Tortilleria, one of the most popular departments, prepares warm, fresh tortillas on a daily basis. The Hot Deli department offers a diverse selection of dishes from Mexico and Latin America.  The seafood department offers a wide variety of fish, shrimp, and freshly prepared dishes. Mi pueblo formally offered to carpool for customers and drive them to their home address with their groceries, however, this service would slowly fade out presumably in the mid-2010s.

The full-service grocery department features over 17,000 imported products as well as mainstream and national brand labels. In October 2014, Mi Pueblo started offering a full range of Western Union services throughout all its stores in the Bay Area, Monterey Peninsula and Central Valley to enhance existing customer needs such as check cashing, utility payments, money transfers and money orders. Tickets to local events are also available at Mi Pueblo.

Controversy over immigration checks
In September 2012, Mi Pueblo was criticized by labor organizations for enrolling in E-verify, a Department of Homeland Security program which screens employees for irregularities in their immigration status. As an owner, Juvenal Chavez was accused of hypocrisy, since he started out in business as an illegal immigrant. A spokesperson for the business said that Chavez supported fixing the "broken" immigration system.

Bankruptcy
On July 22, 2013, Mi Pueblo filed for Chapter 11 bankruptcy citing difficulties with Wells Fargo Bank, their primary lender.  Less than a full year later on June 4, 2014, Mi Pueblo made the official announcement that they formally emerged from Chapter 11 reorganization after having completed a necessary financial restructuring. Part of their newly adopted shared new leadership changes with Javier Ramirez being appointed to the position of president and CEO. Ramirez will succeed Mi Pueblo founder Juvenal Chavez, who will be named chairman of the board. Ramirez is a seasoned CEO in the Hispanic food and grocery sector.

Community involvement
In 2011 Mi Pueblo launched a scholarship program to "help students prepare for a brighter future". In 2014, Mi Pueblo in collaboration with Mexican Heritage Corporation, raised over $100,000 to provide adequate legal representation to unaccompanied minors at the U.S border through its month- long campaign Unidos por los Niños. The campaign surpassed the company's goal thanks to local supporters and the community.

References

External links
 
Mi Pueblo Foods

Companies based in San Jose, California
American companies established in 1991
Retail companies established in 1991
Food and drink in the San Francisco Bay Area
Companies that filed for Chapter 11 bankruptcy in 2013
1991 establishments in California
Supermarkets based in California